Manfred Misselhorn (born 29 July 1938) is a retired German rower who specialized in the coxless four. In this event he won the European title in 1964 and finished in sixth place at the 1964 Summer Olympics.

References

1938 births
Living people
Olympic rowers of the United Team of Germany
Rowers at the 1964 Summer Olympics
West German male rowers
European Rowing Championships medalists